The Pacific/Chocó region is one of the five major natural regions of Colombia.  Ecologically, this region belongs entirely to the  Chocó Biogeographic Region and is considered a biodiversity hotspot. It also has areas with the highest rainfall in the world, with areas near Quibdo, Chocó reaching up to  annually.

Biogeographical subregions
The Pacific region is bordered by the Pacific Ocean to the west and the West Andes to the east.  To the north is the Darién Gap and the Serranía del Darién at the border with Panamá.  The area is mostly flat and covered by dense rainforest, rivers, swamps, and mangroves.  The Baudó Mountains are a small, isolated range in this area along the coast.  Gorgona Island is located off the southwest coast.

Politically, the region is within the following Colombian departments:  Chocó, Valle del Cauca, Cauca and Nariño.

Rivers
From north to south the main rivers are the Atrato, San Juan, Calima, Dagua, Anchicayá, Sanquianga.

Biodiversity
This region has the distinction of being one of the most biodiverse areas on the planet.

Protected areas

 PNN Los Katíos:  along the border with Panamá between the Atrato Swamp and the Serranía de Darién.
 PNN Ensenada de Utria
 PNN Uramba Bahía Málaga
 PNN Isla Gorgona
 PNN Sanquianga: area of mangroves south of Guapí
 SFF Malpelo

See also

Chocó Biogeographic Region

References

.
Natural regions of Colombia